Robert David Atkinson (born November 22, 1954) is a Canadian-American economist. He is president of the Information Technology and Innovation Foundation (ITIF), a public policy think tank based in Washington, D.C., that promotes policies based on innovation economics. He was previously Vice President of the Progressive Policy Institute.

Early life
Atkinson was born in Calgary, Alberta, on November 22, 1954. He moved to the United States in 1962. He received a B.A. from New College of Florida in 1977, a master's degree in Urban and Regional Planning from the University of Oregon in 1985, and a Ph.D. in City and Regional Planning from the University of North Carolina at Chapel Hill in 1989, where he was awarded the Joseph E. Pogue Fellowship.

Career

Atkinson worked as a program director at the National Institute of Standards and Technology (NIST) from 1989 to 1990. In 1990, he joined the now defunct Congressional Office of Technology Assessment, where he produced reports on the impact of information technology on metropolitan areas and the impacts of environmental regulation and defense downsizing on the economy. From 1996 to 1997, he served as the first executive director of the Rhode Island Economic Policy Council. Atkinson became Vice President of the Progressive Policy Institute (PPI) in 1997, where he directed its Technology and New Economy Project.

In 2006, Atkinson left PPI and founded the Information Technology and Innovation Foundation, which Ars Technica has described as "one of the leading, and most prolific, tech policy think tanks." In 2008, Atkinson was appointed by the Bush administration as chair of the National Surface Transportation Infrastructure Financing Commission. In 2009, he advised the Obama-Biden transition's NIST agency review and Technology, Innovation, and Government Reform teams, and in 2011 the Obama administration appointed him to the National Innovation and Competitiveness Strategy Advisory Board. Atkinson also serves as a nonresident senior fellow at the Brookings Institution.

Awards and honors 
In 1996, Atkinson was named a Small Business Advocate of the Year by the U.S. Small Business Administration.
In 1999, he was featured in Marquis' Who's Who in America.
In 2002, he was awarded the Business Transformation Award Silver Medal by the Wharton School and Infosys.
In 2002, he was honored as one of the "GT 25 Doers, Dreamers and Drivers" by Government Technology magazine and the Center for Digital Government.
In 2006, he was listed among Inc. magazine's "Best Friends in D.C.: Thinkers."
In 2009, he was named one of Ars Technica's "Top Tech Policy People to Watch."
In 2011, Washingtonian magazine named him one of their "Tech Titans."

Books 
The Past And Future of America's Economy: Long Waves of Innovation That Power Cycles of Growth, Edward Elgar, 2005
Supply-Side Follies: Why Conservative Economics Fails, Liberal Economics Falters, and Innovation Economics is the Answer, Rowman & Littlefield, 2007
Innovation Economics: The Race for Global Advantage, Yale University Press, 2012
 Big Is Beautiful: Debunking the Myth of Small Business with Michael Lind,, The MIT Press, 2018

References

External links

Living people
1954 births
People from Calgary
21st-century American economists
New College of Florida alumni
University of Oregon alumni
University of North Carolina at Chapel Hill alumni
Canadian emigrants to the United States
Information Technology and Innovation Foundation